Ancula fuegiensis is a species of sea slug, a dorid nudibranch, a marine gastropod mollusc in the family Goniodorididae.

Distribution
This species was first described from Ushuaia, Argentina. It has also been reported from central Chile.

Description
This goniodorid nudibranch is translucent white in colour with black spots. It has only two extra-branchial processes.

Ecology
Ancula fuegiensis probably feeds on Entoprocta which often grow on hydroids, bryozoa and other living substrata.

References

Goniodorididae
Gastropods described in 1926